The Hawkesbury Canoe Classic is an annual marathon canoe race taking place on the Hawkesbury River in Northwest Sydney usually at the end of October. The Hawkesbury Canoe Classic consists of a 111 km paddle downstream starting in Windsor and finishing in Mooney Mooney. The race is Australia's fourth-longest annual canoe race after the 404 km Murray Marathon, the 208 km Riverland Paddling Marathon on the Murray River between Martins Bend and Morgan in South Australia and the 133 km Avon Descent in Western Australia. The Hawkesbury Canoe Classic has over 600 paddlers each year. 
Around 600 paddlers travel 111 km in moonlight, down the Hawkesbury River from Windsor to Brooklyn, to raise money for Charity.
Over the years the Hawkesbury Classic has developed into a great event. Paddlers, their land crew and hundreds of volunteers converge on the banks of the Hawkesbury River at Windsor on the day of the event to enjoy the fun and competition of an overnight paddle, and the now famous camaraderie and spirit of the event.
Paddlers leave Windsor between 4pm and 6pm on Saturday and pass 20 safety checkpoints during the night.
The fastest craft arrive at Brooklyn on Sunday morning in less than 10 hours, but the average time is closer to 15 hours.
The classic began in 1977 and is made possible by volunteers who put in hundreds of hours of time throughout the year, the landowners who allow the use of their land for the weekend and the paddlers and their support crews.
The Classic has raised more than $3.3 million for medical research, the major beneficiary continues to be will be the Arrow, The Bone Marrow Transplant Foundation.

Entry fees and sponsorship monies raised by the Classic go towards supporting medical research.  The first race in 1977 had 250 participants and raised A$8,500.  This has increased over time with $185,000 donated in 2008.  Over 14 years, approximately $2 million has been donated to the Arrow Bone Marrow Transplant Foundation.

The classic is supported by volunteers from the New South Wales State Emergency Service, New South Wales Volunteer Rescue Association and staff from NSW Maritime.

The 2020 and 2021 Events were cancelled due to the COVID-19 pandemic. Despite this, $12,050 and $11,478 was raised in 2020 and 2021 respectively and donated to Arrow.

The 2022 Event is scheduled for the 29-30 October 2022.

Craft types
The Hawkesbury Canoe Classic accommodates boats of all types (canoes, kayaks, outriggers) provided that they are propelled by human muscle. The majority of paddlers use canoes and kayaks with C1, C2, K1, K2 and TK types being the most popular choices. TK2 boats are claimed to be the best boats for the Hawkesbury as they provide stability and speed at the same time. Despite the strengths of the TK boats, professional and elite paddlers opt to compete in Olympic-class boats for the extra speed component. Ocean racing skis are becoming the most popular craft for the out and out racers in this event.

References

External links
 Official Site

Canoeing and kayaking competitions in Australia
Sports competitions in Sydney
Canoe marathon
City of Hawkesbury
Hornsby Shire